Astrorhizana are a subclass of foraminifera characterized by simple tests composed of agglutinated material that can be irregular, spheroidal, or tubular and straight, branching or enrolled. Tests are non septate and consist of a single chamber following the proloculus. These are the Ammodiscacea of the Textulariina in the Treatise Part C, (Loeblich & Tappan 1964) that range from the Cambrian to Recent.

Four orders are included, the Astrorhizida, Dendrofryida, Hippocrepinida, and Saccamminida.

References

V.I. Mikhalevich et al.  Morphological classification of foraminerfera.
A.R. Loeblich Jr and H.Tappan, 1964. Sarcodina Chiefly "Thecamoebians" and Foraminiferida; Treatise on Invertebrate Paleontology, Part C Protista 2. Geological Society of America and University of Kansas Press.

Foraminifera
SAR supergroup subclasses